Samuel Morgan (born September 28, 1981) is a retired American mixed martial artist. A professional from 2001-2008, he competed for the UFC, was a contestant on The Ultimate Fighter 2 and also fought in the Strikeforce, EliteXC, King of the Cage, and Shooto promotions.

Background
Morgan wrestled at Roosevelt High School (Minneapolis) and attended Dunwoody Technical School.

Mixed martial arts career

Early career
Morgan made his professional debut in 2001 and compiled a record of 16-6 with notable wins over Aaron Riley and Duane Ludwig before becoming a contestant on The Ultimate Fighter 2.

The Ultimate Fighter 2
Morgan was picked fifth by Matt Hughes. Competing for Team Hughes, and in his only fight during the show, was defeated by Luke Cummo after being knocked out from a knee strike.

Morgan then fought at The Ultimate Fighter 2 Finale on November 5, 2005 against Josh Burkman. Morgan was knocked out 21 seconds into the fight due to a slam.

After picking up two wins in outside promotions, Morgan made his UFC return at UFC Fight Night 6 on August 17, 2006 against Forrest Petz. Morgan was defeated via unanimous decision in the biggest blowout in UFC history, with judges scores of 30–27, 30–26 and, 30–23.

Post-UFC
After leaving the UFC, Morgan picked up another win in an independent promotion before facing Cung Le at Strikeforce: Four Men Enter, One Man Survives on November 16, 2007. Morgan was defeated in the third round via TKO due to a body kick.

Morgan made his next appearance at ShoXC: Elite Challenger Series against Paul Daley and was defeated in the first round via TKO. Morgan then fought Fabrício Camões at ShoXC: Hamman vs. Suganuma 2 and was defeated via rear-naked choke submission 47 seconds into the fight.

Morgan faced Duane Ludwig at Strikeforce: Payback on October 3, 2008. Morgan lost via first-round TKO.

Mixed martial arts record

|-
| Loss
| align=center| 19–12
| Duane Ludwig
| TKO (punches)
| Strikeforce: Payback
| 
| align=center| 1
| align=center| 2:01
| Denver, Colorado, United States
|Catchweight (165 lbs) bout.
|-
| Loss
| align=center| 19–11
| Fabrício Camões
| Submission (rear-naked choke)
| ShoXC: Hamman vs. Suganuma 2
| 
| align=center| 1
| align=center| 0:47
| Friant, California, United States
|Lightweight bout.
|-
| Loss
| align=center| 19–10
| Paul Daley
| KO (elbow)
| ShoXC: Elite Challenger Series
| 
| align=center| 1
| align=center| 2:12
| Atlantic City, New Jersey, United States
| 
|-
| Loss
| align=center| 19–9
| Cung Le
| TKO (kick to the body)
| Strikeforce: Four Men Enter, One Man Survives
| 
| align=center| 3
| align=center| 1:58
| San Jose, California, United States
|Catchweight (181 lbs) bout.
|-
| Win
| align=center| 19–8
| Sam Jackson
| Submission (rear-naked choke)
| EFX: Myth in Maplewood
| 
| align=center| 1
| align=center| N/A
| Maplewood, Minnesota, United States
| 
|-
| Loss
| align=center| 18–8
| Forrest Petz
| Decision (unanimous)
| UFC Fight Night 6
| 
| align=center| 3
| align=center| 5:00
| Las Vegas, Nevada, United States
| 
|-
| Win
| align=center| 18–7
| Kenneth Allen
| Submission (guillotine choke)
| EFX: Fury
| 
| align=center| 1
| align=center| N/A
| Minnesota, United States
| 
|-
| Win
| align=center| 17–7
| Shannon Ritch
| Submission (toe hold)
| KOTC: The Return
| 
| align=center| 1
| align=center| 1:29
| San Jacinto, California, United States
|Middleweight bout.
|-
| Loss
| align=center| 16–7
| Josh Burkman
| KO (slam and elbows)
| The Ultimate Fighter 2 Finale
| 
| align=center| 1
| align=center| 0:21
| Las Vegas, Nevada, United States
| 
|-
| Win
| align=center| 16–6
| Duane Ludwig
| KO (punches)
| Ring of Fire 16
| 
| align=center| 1
| align=center| 0:52
| Castle Rock, Colorado, United States
| 
|-
| Loss
| align=center| 15–6
| Darin Brudigan
| Submission (triangle armbar)
| Ultimate Combat Sports 4
| 
| align=center| 2
| align=center| 2:30
| Wisconsin, United States
| 
|-
| Win
| align=center| 15–5
| Matt Brady
| Submission (armbar)
| ICC: Trials 2
| 
| align=center| 1
| align=center| N/A
| Minnesota, United States
| 
|-
| Loss
| align=center| 14–5
| Akira Kikuchi
| Submission (armbar)
| Shooto: 3/4 in Kitazawa Town Hall
| 
| align=center| 1
| align=center| 2:51
| Tokyo, Japan
|Return to Welterweight.
|-
| Loss
| align=center| 14–4
| Manny Gamburyan
| Decision (unanimous)
| RSF: Shooto Challenge 2
| 
| align=center| 3
| align=center| 5:00
| Belleville, Illinois, United States
| 
|-
| Win
| align=center| 14–3
| Aaron Riley
| Submission (armbar)
| Shooto USA: Warrior Spirit: Evolution
| 
| align=center| 1
| align=center| 2:41
| Las Vegas, Nevada, United States
| 
|-
| Win
| align=center| 13–3
| Alex Gasson
| Technical Submission (armbar)
| ROF 9: Eruption
| 
| align=center| 2
| align=center| 0:11
| Baraboo, Wisconsin, United States
| 
|-
| Win
| align=center| 12–3
| DR Williams
| Submission (armbar)
| IFA: Explosion
| 
| align=center| 1
| align=center| 1:07
| United States
| 
|-
| Win
| align=center| 11–3
| Ryan Severson
| Submission (armbar)
| IFA: Clash of the Champions
| 
| align=center| 1
| align=center| N/A
| Owatonna, Minnesota, United States
| 
|-
| Win
| align=center| 10–3
| Tom Kirk
| Submission (triangle choke)
| ICC 2: Rebellion
| 
| align=center| 1
| align=center| 2:58
| Minneapolis, Minnesota, United States
|Lightweight bout.
|-
| Win
| align=center| 9–3
| Brad Busho
| Submission (armbar)
| BRB: Bar Room Brawl
| 
| align=center| 1
| align=center| N/A
| United States
| 
|-
| Win
| align=center| 8–3
| Randy Zimmerman
| Submission (triangle choke)
| BRB: Bar Room Brawl
| 
| align=center| 1
| align=center| 2:08
| United States
| 
|-
| Loss
| align=center| 7–3
| Billy Rush
| Submission (toe hold)
| ICC 1: Retribution
| 
| align=center| 1
| align=center| 1:09
| Minneapolis, Minnesota, United States
| 
|-
| Win
| align=center| 7–2
| Chad Rockwite
| DQ (illegal spiking)
| MCS 4: Minnesota Combat Sports 4
| 
| align=center| 2
| align=center| N/A
| Duluth, Minnesota, United States
| 
|-
| Win
| align=center| 6–2
| Mike Henery
| KO (punch)
| MCS 2: Minnesota Combat Sports 2
| 
| align=center| 1
| align=center| 0:40
| Minnesota, United States
| 
|-
| Win
| align=center| 5–2
| John Henery
| TKO (submission to punches)
| MCS 1: Minnesota Combat Sports 1
| 
| align=center| 1
| align=center| N/A
| Minnesota, United States
| 
|-
| Loss
| align=center| 4–2
| Haythem Khalil
| Submission (armbar)
| UW: Amateurs
| 
| align=center| N/A
| align=center| N/A
| Fridley, Minnesota, United States
| 
|-
| Win
| align=center| 4–1
| Joe Sheppard
| TKO (punches)
| UW: Ultimate Wrestling Minnesota
| 
| align=center| 1
| align=center| 0:46
| Minnesota, United States
| 
|-
| Win
| align=center| 3–1
| Roger Stiner
| Submission
| UW: Caged Fights
| 
| align=center| 1
| align=center| 1:18
| St. Paul, Minnesota, United States
| 
|-
| Loss
| align=center| 2–1
| Adrian Serrano
| Submission (armbar)
| UW: Caged Fights
| 
| align=center| 1
| align=center| 0:40
| St. Paul, Minnesota, United States
|Middleweight bout.
|-
| Win
| align=center| 2–0
| Andy Pond
| TKO (punches)
| UW: St. Paul
| 
| align=center| 2
| align=center| 4:30
| St. Paul, Minnesota, United States
| 
|-
| Win
| align=center| 1–0
| Jeff Kislowski
| Submission (toe hold)
| UW: Ultimate Fight Minnesota
| 
| align=center| 1
| align=center| 3:05
| Bloomington, Minnesota, United States
|

References

External links

1981 births
Living people
American male mixed martial artists
Mixed martial artists from Minnesota
Welterweight mixed martial artists
Mixed martial artists utilizing wrestling
Sportspeople from Minneapolis
Roosevelt High School (Minnesota) alumni
Ultimate Fighting Championship male fighters